Arnold Andrew Holt was an English professional footballer in the 1920s.

Born in Sheffield, he joined Gillingham from Chesterfield Municipal in August 1920 and went on to make six appearances for the club in The Football League. He left to join Mansfield Town in November 1920.

References

English footballers
Footballers from Sheffield
Gillingham F.C. players
Mansfield Town F.C. players
Association footballers not categorized by position
Year of birth missing